The Clover Sect (Spanish: La Secta del trébol) is a 1948 Argentine comedy film, directed by Mario Soffici and written by Tulio Demicheli and José Ramón Luna. It premiered on July 21, 1948.

The film is about a writer who gets involved in a police case related to some jewelry belonging to a Chinese sect.

Cast
 Pedro López Lagar
 Santiago Gómez Cou
 Amelia Vargas
 Pascual Nacaratti
 Alberto Terrones
 José Ruzzo
 Néstor Deval
 María Cristina
 Blanca del Prado
 Cayetano Biondo
 Adolfo Linvel
 Mario Baroffio
 Reynaldo Mompel
 Juan Pecci
 Martha Atoche
 Fernando Labat

External links
 

1948 films
1940s Spanish-language films
Argentine black-and-white films
Argentine comedy films
1948 comedy films
1940s Argentine films